The Yuntai Mountain is situated in Xiuwu County, Jiaozuo, Henan Province of People's Republic of China. The Yuntai Geo Park scenic area is classified as a AAAAA scenic area by the China National Tourism Administration.

On 5 October 2015 a recently opened glass walkway to the mountain cracked two weeks after opening causing the closure of the walkway.

References

External links

Official website
Youtube video sponsored by Henan provincial government
 The Red Stone Canyon and Zhuyu Mountain, YunTai Mountain International Culture and Martial Arts School

National parks of China
Mountains of Henan
Waterfalls of China
Jiaozuo
Tourist attractions in Henan
AAAAA-rated tourist attractions
Landforms of Henan
Glass architecture